Froideville may refer to:
Froideville, Vaud, a municipality in the canton of Vaud in Switzerland
Froideville, Jura, a commune in the French region of Franche-Comté